Campo de Gibraltar is a comarca (county) in the province of Cádiz, Spain, in the southwestern part of the autonomous community of Andalusia, the southernmost part of mainland Europe. It comprises the municipalities of Algeciras, La Línea de la Concepción, San Roque, Los Barrios, Castellar de la Frontera, Jimena de la Frontera and Tarifa.

Its name comes from the municipal term of the town of Gibraltar, now a British Overseas Territory. Until 1704, the Campo de Gibraltar was simply the term for the municipality of Gibraltar, about 500 km2 corresponding approximately to the current municipalities of Algeciras, San Roque, Los Barrios and La Línea de la Concepción. Following the capture of Gibraltar during the War of the Spanish Succession the former inhabitants settled nearby creating Algeciras, San Roque, and Los Barrios. In 1759, each of them was established as a different municipality.

The Campo de Gibraltar comarca is composed of the following seven municipalities:

References

External links
Mancomunidad de Municipios del Campo de Gibraltar

Comarcas of the Province of Cádiz